Kenedy Independent School District is a public school district based in Kenedy, Texas (USA).

The district has three campuses - Kenedy High (Grades 9-12), Kenedy Middle (Grades 6-8), and Kenedy Elementary (Grades PK-5).

In 2009, the school district was rated "academically acceptable" by the Texas Education Agency.

References

External links
 

School districts in Karnes County, Texas